The Space Force Association (SFA) is an independent, 501(c)(3) non-profit organization that serves as a professional military association, space advocacy group, and space education association for the United States Space Force and space professionals at large.

Mission
The Space Force Association articulates its mission as providing research, analysis, and expertise to inform United States space operations policy, strategy, and operations decisions. The Space Force Association's three focus areas are:
Being a Network of Experts
Research and Analysis
Philanthropy

The Space Force Association also offers a scholarship program supporting science, technology, engineering, and mathematics undergraduate and graduate students for tuition and research support in space operations related research.

In addition, the Space Force Association provides support for veterans of the United States Space Force, Air Force Space Command, and other military space components, including employment support after transitioning from the military.

History
The Space Force Association was established on 29 October 2019, two months before the establishment of the Space Force on 20 December 2019. The Space Force Association compares itself to the Air Force Association, which was established in January 1946 to support the standup of the United States Air Force, which occurred in September 1947.

Since establishment, the Space Force Association has run a number of interviews and podcasts with Space Force leadership and members on the development of the Space Force and on space policy and strategy. 

On 9 September 2020, several U.S. senators announced the creation of the Space Force Caucus, which the Space Force Association had been working on standing up since March 2020.

References

External links
 

Organizations based in Colorado Springs, Colorado
United States military associations
United States military support organizations
American veterans' organizations
United States Space Force